Milton Wright may refer to:

Milton Wright (bishop) (1828–1917), father of the Wright brothers
Milton Wright (academic) (1903–1972), American academic who studied in Germany